Dampier Highway, formerly known as Karratha-Dampier Road, is a Western Australian highway linking Dampier on the state's north-western coast with the nearby regional centre of Karratha.

The road was completed in the late 1960s as a major link between Karratha and Dampier. While there is no direct connection to the North West Coastal Highway, both De Witt Road and Madigan Road provide links between the two highways at Karratha.

Duplication of Dampier Highway between Balmoral Road West and Burrup Peninsula Road, turning it into a dual carriageway, was completed on 28 February 2013 by the Downer/Highway Construction/Albem Operations Joint Venture.

See also

Highways in Australia
List of highways in Western Australia

References

Highways in rural Western Australia
Pilbara